The reverse Krebs cycle (also known as the reverse tricarboxylic acid cycle, the reverse TCA cycle, or the reverse citric acid cycle, or the reductive tricarboxylic acid cycle, or the reductive TCA cycle) 
is a sequence of chemical reactions that are used by some bacteria to produce carbon compounds from carbon dioxide and water by the use of energy-rich reducing agents as electron donors.

The reaction is the citric acid cycle run in reverse. Where the Krebs cycle takes carbohydrates and oxidizes them to CO2 and water, the reverse cycle takes CO2 and H2O to make carbon compounds.
This process is used by some bacteria (such as Aquificota) to synthesize carbon compounds, sometimes using hydrogen, sulfide, or thiosulfate as electron donors. This process can be seen as an alternative to the fixation of inorganic carbon in the reductive pentose phosphate cycle which occurs in a wide variety of microbes and higher organisms.

Differences from Krebs cycle
In contrast to the oxidative citric acid cycle, the reverse or reductive cycle has a few key differences. There are three enzymes specific to the reductive citric acid cycle, citrate lyase, fumarate reductase, and α-ketoglutarate synthase.  

The splitting of citric acid to oxaloacetate and acetate is in catalyzed by citrate lyase, rather than the reverse reaction of citrate synthase. Succinate dehydrogenase is replaced by fumarate reductase and α-ketoglutarate synthase replaces α-ketoglutarate dehydrogenase.

The conversion of succinate to 2-oxoglutarate is also different. In the oxidative reaction this step is coupled to the reduction of NADH. However, the oxidation of 2-oxoglutarate to succinate is so energetically favorable, that NADH lacks the reductive power to drive the reverse reaction. In the rTCA cycle, this reaction has to use a reduced low potential ferredoxin.

Relevance to early life
The reaction is a possible candidate for prebiotic early-earth conditions and, therefore, is of interest in the research of the origin of life. It has been found that some non-consecutive steps of the cycle can be catalyzed by minerals through photochemistry, while entire two and three-step sequences can be promoted by metal ions such as iron (as reducing agents) under acidic conditions. In addition, these organisms that undergo photochemistry can and do utilize the citric acid cycle. However, the conditions are extremely harsh and require 1 M hydrochloric or 1 M sulfuric acid and strong heating at 80–140 °C.

Along with the these possibilities of the rTCA cycle contributing to early life and biomolecules, it is thought that the rTCA cycle could not have been completed without the use of enzymes. The kinetic and thermodynamic parameters of the reduction of highly oxidized species to push the rTCA cycle are seemingly unlikely without the necessary action of biological catalysts known as enzymes. The rate of some of the reactions in the rTCA cycle likely would have been too slow to contribute significantly to the formation of life on earth without enzymes. Considering the thermodynamics of the rTCA cycle, the increase in Gibb’s Free Energy going from product to reactant would make this cycle an unlikely feat without the help of enzymes.

Medical relevance 
The reverse Krebs cycle is proposed to be a major role in the pathophysiology of melanoma. Melanoma tumors are known to alter normal metabolic pathways in order to utilize waste products. These metabolic adaptations help the tumor adapt to its metabolic needs. The most well know adaptation is the Warburg effect where tumors increase their uptake and utilization of glucose. Glutamine is one of the known substances to be utilized in the reverse Krebs cycle in order to produce acetyl CoA. This type of mitochondrial activity could provide us with a new way to identify and target cancer causing cells.

Microbial use of the reverse Krebs cycle 
Thiomicrospira denitrificans and "Candidatus Arcobacter" have been shown to utilize the rTCA (reverse Krebs cycle) cycle to turn CO2 into a food source. The ability of these bacteria, among others, to use the rTCA cycle supports the idea that they are derived from an ancestral proteobacteria, and that other organisms using this cycle are much more abundant than previously believed.

See also 
Carbon fixation
Calvin cycle

References 

Citric acid cycle
Metabolic pathways
Origin of life